Bilka is a village in Ruen Municipality, in Burgas Province, in southeastern Bulgaria.

Demography
The village of Bilka has 602 inhabitants as of 2011. Nearly all inhabitants are ethnic  Turks (99%).

References

Villages in Burgas Province